Fujiwara no Tamemitsu (藤原 為光) (942–992) was a Japanese statesman, courtier and politician during the Heian period.

Career
Tamemitsu served as a minister during the reigns of Emperor En'yū, Emperor Kazan and Emperor Go-Ichijō.

 985 (Kanna 1}: Tamemitsu was named udaijin.
 991 (Shōryaku 2, 9th month): Tamemitsu was promoted from udaijin to daijō Daijin.

He is referred to as Kōtoku-kō (恒徳公) (posthumous name as Daijō Daijin).

Tamemitsu erected Hōjū-ji temple to mourn his daughter Shishi.

Genealogy
This member of the Fujiwara clan was the son of Fujiwara no Morosuke. His mother was Imperial Princess Masako, daughter of Emperor Daigo.

Tamemitsu had four brothers: Kaneie,  Kanemichi,  Kinsue. and Koretada.

Marriages and Children
Tamemitsu was married to a daughter of Fujiwara no Atsutoshi (first son of Fujiwara no Saneyori). They had at least four children.
 Sanenobu (964–1001) (誠信) - Sangi (参議)
 Tadanobu (or Narinobu) (967–1035) (斉信) - Dainagon
 daughter - married to Fujiwara no Yoshikane (son of Fujiwara no Koretada)
 Shishi (忯子) (969–985) - married to Emperor Kazan

He was also married to a daughter of regent Fujiwara no Koretada.
 Michinobu (道信) (972–994) - poet, one of Thirty-six Poetry Immortals
 Kinnobu (公信) (977–1026) - Gon-no-Chūnagon
 daughter - married to Sadaijin Minamoto no Masanobu
 Genshi (儼子) (died 1016) - side house of Fujiwara no Michinaga
 Jōshi (穠子) (979–1025) - Lady-in-waiting of Empress Kenshi (consort of Emperor Sanjō), and side house of Fujiwara no Michinaga

Notes

References
 Brinkley, Frank and Dairoku Kikuchi. (1915). A History of the Japanese People from the Earliest Times to the End of the Meiji Era. New York: Encyclopædia Britannica. OCLC 413099
 Hioki, Shōichi. (1936). 日本系譜綜覽 (Nihon keifu sōran). Tokyo: Kaizōsha. OCLC 24881833
 Nussbaum, Louis-Frédéric and Käthe Roth. (2005).  Japan encyclopedia. Cambridge: Harvard University Press. ;  OCLC 58053128
 Owada, Tetsuo, Masako Sugawara and Atsushi Nitō. (2003). 日本史諸家系図人名辞典 (Nihonshi shoka keizu jinmei jiten).  Tokyo: Kōdansha. ;  OCLC 675318472
 Titsingh, Isaac. (1834).  Annales des empereurs du Japon (Nihon Odai Ichiran).  Paris: Royal Asiatic Society, Oriental Translation Fund of Great Britain and Ireland. OCLC 5850691

942 births
992 deaths
Fujiwara clan